Martti Liimo (26 September 1941 – 1 December 1995) was a Finnish basketball player. He competed in the men's tournament at the 1964 Summer Olympics.

References

1941 births
1995 deaths
Finnish men's basketball players
Olympic basketball players of Finland
Basketball players at the 1964 Summer Olympics
Sportspeople from Tampere